Joseph A. Sparks (30 September 1901 – 12 January 1981) was a British trade unionist and Labour Party politician.

Early life
Born in Tiverton, Devon, he was the son of Samuel Sparks. Following education at Uffculme School and the Central Labour College in London, he entered employment with the Great Western Railway as a clerk.

Political activity
He quickly became involved in the Labour movement, serving as election agent for the party  at Barnstaple in 1923 and at Taunton in 1924. He subsequently moved to London where he was secretary of the South Kensington Labour Party. He entered local politics at Acton, Middlesex, and was a member of both Acton Borough Council and Middlesex County Council. He was mayor of Acton in 1957–58. He was also President of the London Region of the National Union of Railwaymen for ten years.

Parliamentary career
He made three unsuccessful attempts to enter the Commons, standing at Taunton in 1929, Chelmsford in 1931 and Buckingham in 1935.

In 1945, he was chosen to contest the parliamentary constituency of Acton. There was a landslide in favour of Labour, and he was able to win the seat, overturning a large Conservative majority. Sparks held the seat until the 1959 Conservative landslide, when it was gained by Philip Holland.

Family and death
He married Dora Brent in 1928, and he had 2 sons. He died in the London Borough of Brent in January 1981, aged 79.

References

External links 

1901 births
1981 deaths
British trade unionists
Labour Party (UK) MPs for English constituencies
Mayors of places in Greater London
National Union of Railwaymen-sponsored MPs
UK MPs 1945–1950
UK MPs 1950–1951
UK MPs 1951–1955
UK MPs 1955–1959
Politicians from Tiverton, Devon